A wildcatter is an individual who drills wildcat wells, which are exploration oil wells drilled in areas not known to be oil fields. Notable wildcatters include Glenn McCarthy, Thomas Baker Slick Sr., Mike Benedum, Joe Trees, Clem S. Clarke, and Columbus Marion Joiner; the last is responsible for finding the East Texas Oil Field in 1930.

The term dates from the early oil industry in western Pennsylvania. Oil wells in unproven territory were called "wild cat" wells from mid-1870, and those who drilled them were called "wild-catters" by 1876. For instance, the Titusville Herald noted in 1880: "The discovery of the fluid in New York State was the signal for a general exodus of wildcatters from all parts of the oil country ..."

According to tradition, the origin of the term in the petroleum industry comes from Wildcat Hollow, now in Oil Creek State Park near Titusville, Pennsylvania.  Wildcat Hollow was one of the many productive fields in the early oil era. A speculator who risked his luck by drilling in this narrow valley shot a wildcat, had it stuffed and set it atop his derrick.  The mounted cat gave its name to the hollow.  Because the area was largely untested and somewhat away from Oil Creek Flats, the term Wildcatter was coined, describing a person who risked drilling in an unproven area.

However, wildcat was American slang for any risky business venture by 1838, long before the rise of the petroleum industry. An example was the wildcat banking of the 1850s. Directors of wildcat banks in the Midwest were known as "wild-catters" before Edwin Drake's discovery of oil in Pennsylvania.

See also
Hydrocarbon exploration
William M. Keck

References

External links
Wildcatters and oil barons of America

Petroleum production
History of the petroleum industry in the United States
Oil exploration